Kim Byung-Joo (born January 14, 1968 in Daegu) is a retired South Korean judoka.

He won a gold medal in the -78 kg class at the 1989 World Judo Championships in Belgrade. Kim represented South Korea in the 1992 Olympic Games, winning bronze in the half middleweight division.

He is currently serving as a professor for Korea Air Force Academy.

He is married to judoka Kim Mi-jung.

References

External links
 

Judoka at the 1992 Summer Olympics
Olympic judoka of South Korea
Olympic bronze medalists for South Korea
1968 births
Living people
Sportspeople from Daegu
Olympic medalists in judo
Asian Games medalists in judo
Judoka at the 1990 Asian Games
South Korean male judoka
Medalists at the 1992 Summer Olympics
Asian Games gold medalists for South Korea
Medalists at the 1990 Asian Games
20th-century South Korean people
21st-century South Korean people